Dwayne Rubin, better known by his stage name Dwayne Dopsie, is an American Zydeco musician. He is the accordionist and vocalist for his New Orleans-based band, Dwayne Dopsie and the Zydeco Hellraisers.

Biography 
Dwayne Dopsie is the youngest of accordionist Rockin' Dopsie's eight children, and picked up music in the household from an early age. He began playing washboard at age six and accordion at seven, and performed with his father on stage at Mardi Gras and on television for a Super Bowl halftime during his childhood. 

After Rockin' Dopsie died in 1993, Dwayne Dopsie dropped out of high school to pursue zydeco music full-time. He founded his own band, the Zydeco Hellraisers, in 1999 when he was nineteen years old, and that same year was named "America's Hottest Accordionist" in a competition run by the American Accordion Association. 

In 2013, Dopsie collaborated with Corey Ledet, Anthony Dopsie and Andre Thierry on the album Nothin' But the Best, which was nominated for a Grammy Award for Best Regional Roots Music Album. Dopsie received another nomination in the same category for his 2017 album Top of the Mountain. Dopsie plays regularly at New Orleans events such as Mardi Gras and Jazz & Heritage Festival, has done numerous tours of the United States, and has toured internationally several times, including performances in Canada, Georgia, and China. In 2018, Dopsie signed with Louisiana Red Hot Records, who released Bon Ton in the June, 2019.

Music 
Dopsie's style is grounded in Zydeco but incorporates musical elements from rock and roll, rhythm and blues, blues, and reggae.

Zydeco Hellraisers members
Current
Dwayne Dopsie - accordion, vocals
Brandon David - guitar, vocals
Percy Walker - drums
Dion Pierre - bass
Paul Lafleur - washboard 
Tim McFatter - saxophone

Former
Alex MacDonald - washboard, vocals
Calvin Sam - drums
Carl Landry - saxophone
Shelton Sonnier - guitar, vocals
Vincent Doucet - washboard
Kipori Woods - guitar
Dee Fleming - drums
Kevin Minor - drums
Reggie Smith Jr. - saxophone

Discography
Studio albums
Now It Begins (1999)
Dopsie Strikes (2001)
Travelin' Man (2006)
Up In Flames (2009)
Been Good To You (2011)
Calling Your Name (2015)
Top Of The Mountain (2017, Grammy Nominated)
Bon Ton (2019)

Live albums
Get Down! (2011)
Dopsie's Got It (2014)

References

Year of birth missing (living people)
Living people
American male singers
Zydeco musicians
American accordionists
Musicians from Louisiana
21st-century accordionists
21st-century American male musicians